Asylum Choir II is the second and final album, after the 1968 debut Look Inside the Asylum Choir, of the studio aggregation consisting of Leon Russell and Marc Benno. It was recorded and expected to be released in 1969, but legal issues held up its release for two years. The 1990 digitally remastered CD re-release contains as bonus cuts all but three of the tracks from their first album.

Track listing
All tracks composed by Leon Russell and Marc Benno except where indicated

Side One
"Sweet Home Chicago" – 3:20
"Down on the Base" – 2:18
"Hello, Little Friend" (Russell) – 2:52
"Salty Candy" – 2:26
"Tryin' to Stay 'Live" – 2:50

Side Two
"Intro to Rita" – 2:07
"Straight Brother" – 3:08
"Learn How to Boogie" – 2:40
"Ballad for a Soldier" (Russell) – 4:25
"When You Wish upon a Fag" (Russell) – 4:10
"Lady in Waiting" (Russell) – 3:37
The CD re-issue contains the following bonus tracks:
"Welcome to Hollywood" – 2:35
"Death of the Flowers" (Russell, Benno, Greg Dempsey) – 2:08
 "Icicle Star Tree" – 2:55
Medley: "N.Y. Op", "Land of Dog", "Henri the Clown" – 6:07
"Soul Food" (Russell, Benno, Bill Boatman, Jimmy Markham) – 2:05

Charts

Personnel 

Marc Benno – guitars, vocals
Leon Russell – bass, guitar, keyboards, piano, vocals
Jesse Ed Davis – guitars
Chuck Blackwell – drums
Carl Radle – bass
Donald Dunn – bass

References

External links
	
 Asylum Choir II at Myspace (streamed copy where licensed)
Official Leon Russell website
Official Marc Benno website
Leon Russell discography
Leon Russell lyrics 
Leon Russell Records
Leon Russell NAMM Oral History Program Interview (2012)

1971 albums
The Asylum Choir albums
Albums produced by Leon Russell
Albums produced by Marc Benno
Shelter Records albums